Hammond Northshore Regional Airport  is a city-owned, public-use, joint civil-military, general aviation airport located three nautical miles (6 km) northeast of the central business district of Hammond, a city in Tangipahoa Parish, Louisiana, United States. The airport was previously an uncontrolled facility utilizing VHF-band UNICOM as a Common Traffic Advisory Frequency (CTAF). As a result of the relocation of Army National Guard flight operations from Lakefront Airport to Hammond, a new control tower was constructed at the airport. This tower, staffed by military air traffic controllers from the Air Operations Department of the Louisiana Army National Guard's Army Aviation Support Facility #1 at the airport, became operational on 15 December 2014.

Although most U.S. airports use the same three-letter location identifier for the FAA and IATA, this airport is assigned HDC by the FAA but has no designation from the IATA.

Facilities and aircraft 
It has two runways: 13/31 is 6,502 by 100 feet (1,982 x 30 m) with an asphalt/concrete surface; 18/36 is 5,001 by 150 feet (1,524 x 46 m) with a concrete surface.

For the 12-month period ending April 16, 2008, the airport had 76,850 aircraft operations, an average of 210 per day: 82% general aviation, 16% military and 2% air taxi. At that time there were 113 aircraft based at this airport: 67% single-engine, 18% military, 9% multi-engine, 5% jet and 1% helicopter.

The Louisiana Army National Guard maintains a  campus (constructed in 2008-2009) at the Hammond airport, which is home to the 1/244th Air Assault Helicopter Battalion, which operates UH-60 Blackhawk helicopters, and the 204th Theater Air Operation Command. The Louisiana Air National Guard also maintains a non-flying unit, the 236th Combat Communications Squadron (236 CCS), at the airport.

History 
During World War II, part of the airport served as a detention camp for prisoners of war from Germany.

References

External links 
 Hammond Northshore Regional Airport at City of Hammond website
 

Airports in Louisiana
Buildings and structures in Tangipahoa Parish, Louisiana
Hammond, Louisiana
Transportation in Tangipahoa Parish, Louisiana
Transportation in the New Orleans metropolitan area
Airports in the New Orleans metropolitan area
Military installations in Louisiana